Matthew Le Geyt (Jèrriais: Matchi L’Gé; 1777–1849) was the first poet to publish in Jèrriais following the introduction of printing. The earliest dated piece of his writing comes from 1795. He was from St Helier but he must have lived in Trinity as well where he was a Vingtenier.

Further reading
Robert Pipon Marett, Les Manuscrits de Philippe Le Geyt, écuyer, lieutenant-bailli de l'île de Jersey, sur la constitution, les lois et les usages de cette île, Notice sur la vie et les écrits de Mons. Le Geyt, Jersey: P. Falle, 1846-1847

Norman-language writers
Jersey writers
1777 births
1849 deaths